is a 1982 Japanese pink film directed by Toshiyuki Mizutani.

Synopsis
Kazu is a man who indulges in daydream fantasies of sexual dalliances with women. As his fantasies become increasingly violent and even homicidal, neither he nor the film's audience is sure whether these are really harmless, if perverse, fantasies or if they are really happening.

Cast
 Kazuhiro Yamaji as Kazu
 Shinobu Nami
 Makoto Yoshino
 Mika Hijiri
 Seiko Munakata

Background
Director Toshiyuki Mizutani's first film as was Lust Hunting: Office Lady Rape (also 1982), which Thomas and Yuko Mihara Weisser label a "wicked debut". For his interest in cinematic violence critics dubbed him "The Pink Demon". Raped with Eyes: Daydream is Mizutani's best-known work. With this film, Mizutani added the elements of surrealism and fantasy which enabled him to distance himself and the audience from the on-screen mayhem and to add a further level of meaning to the scenario. The Weissers write, "The psychotic perspective of the film compensates for the offensive message."

Availability
Toshiyuki Mizutani filmed Raped with Eyes: Daydream for director Banmei Takahashi's Takahashi Productions, and it was released theatrically in Japan by Shintōhō Eiga in September 1982. On May 21, 1999 under the title , Arena Entertainment released Raped with Eyes: Daydream on DVD as the second in their .

Bibliography

English

Japanese

References

1982 films
Erotic fantasy films
1980s Japanese-language films
Pink films
Shintōhō Eiga films
1980s Japanese films